Azeem Victor (born September 19, 1995) is an American football linebacker who is currently a free agent. He played college football at Washington.

College career
He played college football for Washington. Victor was a first-team all-Pac-12 selection in 2016 after posting 67 tackles but missed the last month with a broken tibia. Going into the 2017 season, Victor was an Associated Press preseason first-team All-American. His season ended in November after he was suspended by coach Chris Petersen for a DUI charge.

Professional career

Oakland Raiders
Victor was drafted by the Oakland Raiders in the sixth round (216th overall) of the 2018 NFL Draft. He was waived on September 1, 2018.

Tampa Bay Buccaneers
On September 3, 2018, Victor was signed to the Tampa Bay Buccaneers' practice squad. He was released on September 11, 2018.

Seattle Seahawks
On September 26, 2018, Victor was signed to the Seattle Seahawks' practice squad. He was released on October 23, 2018.

Orlando Apollos
In 2019, Victor joined the Orlando Apollos of the Alliance of American Football. He was waived on March 12, 2019.

Victor was suspended for the first 10 weeks of the 2019 NFL season on April 24, 2019. He was reinstated from suspension on November 12, 2019.

Victor signed with the Alphas of The Spring League in May 2021.

Victor was selected in the 29th round of the 2022 USFL Draft by the Houston Gamblers. He was released on May 20, 2022.

References

External links
 Washington Huskies bio

1995 births
Living people
Players of American football from Compton, California
American football linebackers
Washington Huskies football players
Oakland Raiders players
Tampa Bay Buccaneers players
Seattle Seahawks players
Orlando Apollos players
The Spring League players
Houston Gamblers (2022) players